The Supreme Soviet of the Latvian SSR (Latvian: Latvijas PSR Augstākā Padome; Russian: Верховный Совет Латвийской ССР, Verkhovnyy Sovet Latvyyskoy SSR) was the supreme soviet (main legislative institution) of the Latvian SSR, one of the union republics of the Soviet Union. The Supreme Soviet of the Latvian SSR was established in 1940 and finally disbanded in 1990 and was briefly succeeded by the Supreme Council of the Republic of Latvia. According to the 1978 Constitution of the Latvian SSR, representatives could serve an unlimited amount of 5-year terms. The Supreme Soviet consisted of 325 deputies before its dissolution.

Organization 
The structure and functions of the Supreme Soviet of the Latvian SSR were copied from the Supreme Soviet of the Soviet Union. The sessions of the Supreme Soviet lasted only several days twice a year and decisions were made unanimously and without much discussion. Elections for the Supreme Soviet were held in 1947, 1951, 1955, 1959, 1963, 1967, 1971, 1975, 1980, 1985, and 1990. The amount of deputies in the Supreme Soviet was increased from 310 to 325 in the 1978 Constitution of the Latvian SSR. The Supreme Soviet of the Latvian SSR gathered and met at the House of the Livonian Noble Corporation; the building currently houses the Saeima of Latvia.

Chairmen of the Supreme Soviet

Chairmen of the Presidium of the Supreme Soviet

See also 

 On the Restoration of Independence of the Republic of Latvia
 Supreme Soviet of the Soviet Union
 Supreme Council of the Republic of Latvia
 Saeima

References 

Saeima
Historical legislatures
Latvian Soviet Socialist Republic
1940 establishments in Latvia
1990 disestablishments in Latvia
Defunct unicameral legislatures
Latvian